Manmohan Mahapatra (ମନମୋହନ ମହାପାତ୍ର, 10 November 1951 – 13 January 2020) was an Odia filmmaker, director, producer, and writer. He won eight consecutive national film awards for his films Nishita Swapna, Majhi Pahacha, Tired Afternoon, Neeraba Jhada, Seeta Raati, and Bhinna Samaya, among others.

His first film Seeta Raati made in 1976 was the first Odia film to be screened at international film festival in 1982.

On 13 January 2020, Mahapatra died in a private hospital in Bhubaneswar at age 68 after battling prolonged kidney and heart ailments .

Manmohan Mahapatra is the recipient of India's highly prestigious award Padma Shri 2020 for his work in the field of art.

Filmography

Mahapatra studied film making at the FTII, Pune, and made a first short film Anti-Memoirs (Anti-Memories) in 1975. He made his first full-fledged Odia film Seeta Raati as a director in 1976. It won him the National Film Award for Best Feature Film in Odia and was screened at international film festival in 1982 — making it the first Odia film to be screened at foreign film festival.

He made couple of short films and then directed Neerab Jhada that won him another National Film Award for Best Feature Film in Odia out of eight consecutive national awards for best feature film in Odia.

He also directed a few Hindi films, notably — Bits and Pieces starring Nandita Das, Rahul Bose, and Dia Mirza.

As director
Anti-Memoirs and Anti-Memories (documentary)
Seeta Raati
Voices of Silence (documentary)
Konrak: The Sun Temple (documentary)
Neeraba Jhada (feature film)
Klanta Aparahna (feature film)
Trisandhya(feature film)
Majhi Pahacha (feature film)
Nisiddha Swapna (feature film)
Kichi Smruti Kichu Anubhuti (feature film)
Andha Diganta (feature film)
Vinya Samaya (feature film)
Agni Veena (feature film)
Muhurta (feature film)

As writer
Seeta Raati – Bibhuti Pattnaik
Neerab Jhada – screenplay
Klanta Aparahna (Odia) – story
Tired Afternoon – story
Majhi Pahacaha 
Forbidden Dream
Bhinna Samaya
Muhurta – dialogue – screenplay – story – Barendra Dhal

As producer
Forbidden Dream
Neerab Jhada

See also
National Film Award for Best Feature Film in Odia
29th National Film Awards
31st National Film Awards
32nd National Film Awards
34th National Film Awards
35th National Film Awards
36th National Film Awards
37th National Film Awards
40th National Film Awards

References

External
My next film explores generation clash: Manmohan Mahaptra
Klanta Aparanha – Story, Screenplay & Direction: Manmohan Mahapatra – National Film Awards – Best Regional Film – Odia (Silver Lotus)
Orissa: Manmohan Mahapatra the Father of Oriya New wave Cinema
MANMOHAN POHAPATRA – Director`s Profile
Bits 'N' Pieces: Mahapatra's introspective film

Odia film directors
Odia film producers
Hindi-language film directors
Film producers from Odisha
1951 births
2020 deaths
Odia screenwriters
Film directors from Odisha
Odia film screenwriters
Screenwriters from Odisha
Recipients of the Padma Shri in arts